The 2015–16 CONCACAF Champions League knockout stage was played from February 23 to April 27, 2016. A total of eight teams competed in the knockout stage to decide the champions of the 2015–16 CONCACAF Champions League.

Qualified teams
The winners of each of the eight groups in the group stage qualified for the knockout stage.

Seeding

The qualified teams were seeded 1–8 in the knockout stage according to their results in the group stage.

Format

In the knockout stage, the eight teams played a single-elimination tournament. Each tie was played on a home-and-away two-legged basis, with the higher-seeded team hosting the second leg. The away goals rule would be used if the aggregate score was level after normal time of the second leg, but not after extra time, and so a tie would be decided by penalty shoot-out if the aggregate score was level after extra time of the second leg (Regulations, II. C. Tie-Breaker Procedures).

Starting from this season, the higher-seeded team in each tie would host the second leg throughout the knockout stage.

Bracket
The bracket of the knockout stage was determined by the seeding as follows:
Quarter-finals:
QF1: Seed 1 vs. Seed 8
QF2: Seed 2 vs. Seed 7
QF3: Seed 3 vs. Seed 6
QF4: Seed 4 vs. Seed 5
Semi-finals:
SF1: Winner QF1 vs. Winner QF4
SF2: Winner QF2 vs. Winner QF3
Final: Winner SF1 vs. Winner SF2

Quarter-finals
The first legs were played on February 23–24, and the second legs were played on March 1–2, 2016.

|}

All times U.S. Eastern Standard Time (UTC−5)

América won 5–3 on aggregate.

Querétaro won 3–1 on aggregate.

UANL won 3–1 on aggregate.

Santos Laguna won 4–0 on aggregate.

Semi-finals
The first legs were played on March 15–16, and the second legs were played on April 5, 2016.

|}

All times U.S. Eastern Daylight Time (UTC−4)

América won 1–0 on aggregate.

UANL won 2–0 on aggregate.

Final

The first leg was played on April 20, and the second leg was played on April 27, 2016.

|}

All times U.S. Eastern Daylight Time (UTC−4)

América won 4–1 on aggregate.

References

External links
CONCACAF Champions League , CONCACAF.com

3